Irma Córdoba (July 20, 1913 – May 18, 2008) was an Argentine film actress of the classic era.

She entered the film industry in 1932 and appeared in over 30 films, spanning 65 years of Argentine film. She appeared in films such as Fuera de la ley 1937 and Atorrante (1939). She retired in 1997.

Partial filmography

Rapsodia gaucha (1932)
Buenos Aires Nights (1935)
The Favorite (1935) - Esther Peña
Internado (1935)
El Forastero (1937)
The Boys Didn't Wear Hair Gel Before (1937) - Camila Peña
La Muchacha del circo (1937)
Fuera de la ley (1937) - Emilia
Three Argentines in Paris (1938) - Ángela Torres
Cuatro corazones (1939)
Atorrante (1941)
Último refugio (1941)
Noche de bodas (1942)
A Light in the Window (1942) - Angélica
Locos de verano (1942)
Delirio (1944)
Deshojando margaritas (1946)
Christmas with the Poor (1947) - Marta
Mirad los lirios del campo (1947)
Cinco gallinas y el cielo (1957)
Mi marido y mi padrino (1957, TV Series)
El Festín de Satanás (1958)
Show Standard Electric (1965, TV Mini-Series)
Las Locas del conventillo (1966) - Tía Soledad
Maternidad sin hombres (1968)
Esta noche... miedo (1970, TV Series)
La Sonrisa de mamá (1972)
Me llaman Gorrión (1972, TV Series) - Celia (unknown episodes)
Me gusta esa chica (1973)
Separate Tables (1974, TV Movie) - Mrs. Maude Raillon-Bell
Profesión, ama de casa (1979, TV Series) - Mercedes
Fabián 2 Mariana 0 (1980, TV Series)
Bárbara (1980) - La Dama
Venido a menos (1984) - Memé
Yolanda Luján (1984, TV Series) - Sara Sotomayor
Amor prohibido (1986, TV Series) - Remedios
Stress (1990, TV Series) - Maruca
El Precio del poder (1992, TV Series) - Mother of Lucio
Eva Perón (1996) - Marguarita Achaval Junco
El Mundo contra mí (1997) - Abuela

References

External links
 

1913 births
2008 deaths
Argentine film actresses
People from Buenos Aires
Burials at La Chacarita Cemetery